The Melbourne Rectangular Stadium, known as AAMI Park for sponsorship reasons, is an outdoor sports stadium on the site of Edwin Flack Field in the Sports and Entertainment Precinct in the Melbourne central business district.

When completed in 2010, it was Melbourne's first large purpose-built rectangular stadium. When the project to build the new stadium was approved, the largest stadiums in use were the Melbourne Cricket Ground (MCG) and Docklands Stadium. These were venues of oval configuration and best suited to Australian rules football or cricket. The previous largest rectangular stadium in the city, Olympic Park, was a repurposed track and field venue.

The stadium's major tenants are National Rugby League team Melbourne Storm, the Super Rugby team Melbourne Rebels, and the A-League teams Melbourne Victory FC and Melbourne City FC. It was also one of five venues for the 2015 AFC Asian Cup, hosting the opening match and six other matches including one quarter-final game, and it will host matches for the 2023 FIFA Women's World Cup.  The venue hosted rugby league Four Nations matches in 2010 and 2014, and was used for the 2017 Rugby League World Cup.

Referred to as Melbourne Rectangular Stadium during its construction, the ground has been known as AAMI Park since it opened in March 2010, in a sponsorship deal with insurance firm AAMI.

History

Prior to construction
Until 2010, Olympic Park Stadium was Melbourne's main venue for soccer, rugby league and rugby union; not purpose-built, it was an athletics stadium with the rectangular grass field set inside the running track, and it could hold 18,500 spectators, but only 11,000 seated. It had been the home ground of the Melbourne Storm since they entered the National Rugby League in 1998. The A-League's Melbourne Victory FC also used Olympic Park Stadium from 2005 to 2007 when they switched permanently to Docklands Stadium.

In 2004, as part of Melbourne's bid for a Super Rugby team, the Victorian Government prepared an economic impact study on the development of a world class rectangular stadium in Melbourne. But in late 2004, the bid lost out to the Western Australian consortium, which would become the Western Force.

On 6 April 2006 the Victorian Government announced that a $190 million 20,000-seat rectangular stadium would be built on the site of Edwin Flack Field and would be home to NRL team Melbourne Storm and A-League team Melbourne Victory. The stadium's planned capacity was increased to 30,000, with foundations capable of expansion to a capacity of 50,000 if needed. The stadium began construction in late 2007.

In November 2009, when the Super Rugby competition expanded to 15 teams, the Melbourne consortium won the 15th Super Rugby licence, with the new franchise intending to play their games at the new stadium.

The stadium's first match was the 2010 Anzac Test between the Australian and New Zealand rugby league teams on 7 May 2010. The stadium was referred to as Melbourne Rectangular Stadium, Swan Street Stadium or the Bubble Dome during its early construction. The stadium's commercial name was announced as AAMI Park on 16 March 2010; initially an eight-year deal, it has been twice extended with the current AAMI sponsorship deal set to expire in 2026.

Notable events hosted: 2010s

Rugby league
The stadium held its first event, rugby league's 2010 Anzac Test, on 7 May 2010. The opening ceremony featured the NRL's all-time highest point-scorer, Hazem El Masri, who had retired the previous season, kicking a goal. The first points scored on the ground were from a Jamie Lyon penalty kick in the 32nd minute, and the first try was scored by Brett Morris in the 39th minute. Australia defeated New Zealand 12–8 in front of a sell-out crowd (near 30,000). Two days later the first National Rugby League match was played at the stadium when the Brisbane Broncos defeated the Melbourne Storm in front of a crowd of 20,042.

Melbourne Rectangular Stadium hosted international matches as part of the Rugby League Four Nations in 2010 and 2014, when Australia defeated England by 34–14 in front of 18,894 fans on 31 October 2010, and again when Australia defeated England by 16–12 on 2 November 2014 (attendance: 20,585).

Soccer
On 5 August 2010 the stadium played host to its first A-League match. It was also another first, as the newly formed Melbourne Heart FC played their first game in front of 11,050 fans against the Central Coast Mariners. The Heart lost 1–0, and Alex Wilkinson had the honour of scoring the first goal. The first Melbourne Victory match was played at Melbourne Rectangular Stadium v Perth Glory on 14 August 2010 in front of 21,193 fans.

The venue hosted the 2015 AFC Asian Cup opening ceremony and seven international matches including the tournament opener between Australia and Kuwait on 9 January, and a quarter-final match South Korea and Uzbekistan on 22 January.

As of the 2020-21 A-League season, Western United FC began also playing home games out of the Melbourne Rectangular Stadium, while they continued to wait for their own stadium to be built in West Melbourne. As of the 2022-23 A-League season, the Melbourne Rectangular Stadium remains their primary home venue.

Rugby union
The Melbourne Rebels played their first Super Rugby match at Melbourne Rectangular Stadium on 18 February 2011. The Melbourne Rising played their first National Rugby Championship match on 24 August 2014, defeating the North Harbour Rays by a resounding 55–34 score. The Rising played a semifinal at the stadium on 25 October 2014, but lost by 29–45 to the Perth Spirit.

Melbourne Football Club (AFL) training and administrative facilities
The Melbourne Football Club in the Australian Football League (AFL) moved its indoor training and administrative facilities to the park in 2010, and train at their nearby outdoor training ground at Gosch's Paddock.

Stadium design

Features
The COX Architecture designed stadium features a "Bioframe" design, with a geodesic dome roof covering much of the seating area, while still allowing light through to the pitch. The northern and southern sides of the stadiums are called the Olympic Side and Yarra Side respectively. The exterior of the stadium is covered in thousands of LED lights which can be programmed to display a variety of patterns and images.

The stadium includes training facilities and office accommodation for Melbourne Storm, Melbourne Victory, Melbourne Football Club, the Victorian Rugby Union, the Victorian Olympic Council, Olympic Park Sports Medicine Centre (OPSMC), Imaging@Olympic Park Radiology and Tennis Victoria. The stadium is used by the Melbourne Demons as their administration headquarters. The team had wanted the stadium completed by 2008 to coincide with its 150th anniversary. It has planned to house public bars and cafes, 24 corporate boxes, a dining room with a capacity of 1000 people, a gym and lap pool.

Capacity

The stadium was initially proposed to have a seating capacity of 20,000, upgradeable to 25,000.  This was due to both expected demand, as well as a state government agreement with Docklands Stadium that no stadiums with a capacity greater than 30,000 would be constructed in Melbourne before 2010. These plans were revised after the Victory refused to commit to playing at a stadium of such small capacity, having achieved an average attendance of over 27,000 since their move to the Docklands Stadium in the 2006–07 A-League Season.

Alternative plans put forward by the Victorian Government proposed a capacity of 30,050, on the condition that the Victory sign on as a tenant. An agreement was reached and the stadium went ahead at this capacity. To assist with the extended capacity, temporary stands can be erected behind the goals during soccer matches and removed during rugby league and union games so as to allow space for the in-goal area (an international soccer pitch measures 105 metres in length, while including the in-goal areas, rugby league and rugby union have a minimum field length of 116 and 120 metres respectively). Although the stadium was built with foundations to allow for future expansion to 50,000, the roof was not designed with this in mind, and so the stadium cannot be expanded without major construction work. Construction of the stadium was featured during a 2010 episode of the TV show Build It Bigger.

Upgrades
Following the stadium's opening in 2010, the stadium's features were first upgraded in early 2023, ahead of its fixtures for the 2023 FIFA Women's World Cup. The Victorian Government contributed $25 million to replace the old video screens with two new curved screens, install LED sports light technology in the light towers and under the roof canopy, and replace static advertising and wayfinding boards with LED. Player facilities, broadcasting and corporate facilities were also improved as a result of the upgrade.

Crowd records

Concerts

Sports events

Rugby league test matches
The stadium has hosted five rugby league internationals. The results were as follows;

2015 AFC Asian Cup

Awards
In June 2012 the stadium won the award for the most iconic and culturally significant stadium at the 2012 World Stadium Awards, held in Doha, Qatar.

References

External links

 AAMI Park official website
 

2010 establishments in Australia
Sports venues completed in 2010
Melbourne Storm
Rugby league stadiums in Australia
Sports venues in Melbourne
Melbourne Victory FC
Melbourne City FC
Rugby union stadiums in Australia
Melbourne Rebels
A-League Men stadiums
A-League Women stadiums
Multi-purpose stadiums in Australia
Philip Cox buildings
Soccer venues in Melbourne
2023 FIFA Women's World Cup stadiums
Venues of the 2032 Summer Olympics and Paralympics
Buildings and structures in the City of Melbourne (LGA)
Sport in the City of Melbourne (LGA)